Panay is the sixth-largest and fourth-most populous island in the Philippines.

Panay may also refer to

Places

Philippines
Panay, Capiz, a municipality on Panay island
Panay River on Panay island
Panay Gulf in Western Visayas, near Panay island
Panay (Catanduanes), a small island in Bicol Region

Iran
Panay, Iran

Uzbekistan
 Panay, Uzbekistan - populated place in Uzbekistan

People
 Panos Panay, born 1972, Cypriot entrepreneur
 Panos Panay (Microsoft), a Microsoft vice-president

Other
 Panay (film), a 2015 Taiwanese film
 USS Panay (three different ships)
Panay incident

Animals
Panay cloudrunner, mammal
Panay striped babbler, bird
Panay giant fruit bat
Panay forest frog
Panay monitor lizard